Füsun is a Turkish feminine given name, and it may refer to:

Füsun Eczacıbaşı, Turkish supporter of contemporary art
Füsun Köksal (born 1973), Turkish composer of contemporary classical music
Füsun Onur (born 1938), Turkish artist
Füsun Önal (born 1947), Turkish pop music singer, theater actress and writer
Füsun Sayek (1947–2006), Turkish ophtalmalogists

Turkish given names